The Rietkuil mine is a large mine located in the northern part of South Africa in Gauteng. Rietkuil represents one of the largest uranium reserves in South Africa having estimated reserves of 127.8 million tonnes of ore grading 0.043% uranium.

See also 
 List of mines in South Africa

References 

Uranium mines in South Africa
Economy of Gauteng